Poseidonia (named after Poseidon) is a village and a former municipality on the island of Syros, in the Cyclades, Greece. Since the 2011 local government reform it is part of the municipality Syros-Ermoupoli, of which it is a municipal unit. The population was 3,893 inhabitants at the 2011 census, and the land area is 23.705 km². The municipal unit shares the island of Syros with the municipal units of Ano Syros and Ermoupoli. It is also known as Dellagrazia (name taken from a small church of Maria della Grazia).

References

Populated places in Syros